Alice Maria Seagren (born July 6, 1947) is an American politician in the state of Minnesota. She served in the Minnesota House of Representatives, and as Commissioner of the Minnesota Department of Education from 2004 to 2011.

References

Women state legislators in Minnesota
Republican Party members of the Minnesota House of Representatives
State cabinet secretaries of Minnesota
1947 births
Living people
21st-century American women